Bishop Walden Perkins (October 18, 1841June 20, 1894) was a United States representative and Senator from Kansas. Born in Rochester, Ohio, he attended the common schools and Knox College (Galesburg, Illinois). He prospected for gold through California and New Mexico from 1860 to 1862 and served four years in the Union Army during the Civil War as sergeant, adjutant, and captain. He studied law in Ottawa, Illinois and was admitted to the bar in 1867, commencing the practice of law in Princeton, Indiana. He moved to Oswego, Kansas and continued practice; he was a local county attorney for the Missouri, Kansas & Texas Railroad for two years and prosecuting attorney of Labette County in 1869. He was a judge of the probate court of Labette County from 1870 to 1882, and became editor of the Oswego Register in 1873.

Perkins was elected as a Republican to the Forty-eighth and to the three succeeding Congresses, serving from March 4, 1883 – March 3, 1891. He was an unsuccessful candidate for reelection in 1890 to the Fifty-second Congress, but was appointed to the U.S. Senate to fill the vacancy caused by the death of Preston B. Plumb, and served from January 1, 1892, to March 3, 1893, when a successor was elected and qualified. He resumed the practice of his profession in Washington, D.C. and died there in 1894; interment was in Rock Creek Cemetery.

References

External links

 
 

1841 births
1894 deaths
Kansas state court judges
Republican Party United States senators from Kansas
People from Oswego, Kansas
People from Lorain County, Ohio
Republican Party members of the United States House of Representatives from Kansas
People from Princeton, Indiana
19th-century American politicians
Washington, D.C., Republicans
19th-century American judges